Pittington railway station served the village of Pittington, County Durham, England, from 1837 to 1960 on the Durham and Sunderland Railway.

History 
The station opened on 6 November 1837 by the Durham and Sunderland Railway. It was situated on the east side of Station Road. It was rebuilt in 1875 with a new signal box being installed on the platform. This was replaced in 1948. The station closed to passengers on 5 January 1953 and closed to goods on 4 January 1960. The site is now a cycle way.

References

External links 

Disused railway stations in County Durham
Railway stations in Great Britain opened in 1837
Railway stations in Great Britain closed in 1964
1837 establishments in England
1964 disestablishments in England
Pittington